Alexander David O'Connor  is a Fijian politician and former Member of the Parliament of Fiji for the FijiFirst Party. He served as the assistant Minister for Health and Medical Services. He was re-elected to Parliament in the 2018 election. O'Connor is from Nakasaleka, Kadavu. He resides in Lautoka. He has worked in the private sector at management level. He is married to Margaret O'Connor with 3 children.

References

I-Taukei Fijian members of the Parliament of Fiji
I-Taukei Fijian people
FijiFirst politicians
Fijian civil servants
Politicians from Kadavu Province
People from Kadavu Province
Living people
Year of birth missing (living people)